Kim Jong-un (born 1983 or 1984) is the current General Secretary of the Workers' Party of Korea, serving as the 3rd supreme leader of North Korea.

Kim Jong-un may also refer to:
Kim Jung-eun (born 1975), South Korean actress
Kim Ji-woo (born 1983), South Korean actress, legal name 김정은
Yesung (born 1984), South Korean singer and actor, legal name 김종운
Kim Jong-eun (born 1986), South Korean field hockey player 
Kim Lip (born 1999), South Korean singer, legal name 김정은
Howard X, an Australian-Hong Kong Chinese impersonator.